Louisiana Story is a 1948 American black-and-white drama film directed by Robert J. Flaherty. Although it has historically been represented as a documentary film, the events and characters depicted are fictional and the film was commissioned by the Standard Oil Company to promote its drilling ventures in the Louisiana bayous.  There is not enough factual or educational material in the film to even warrant classifying it as docufiction. Its script was written by Frances H. Flaherty and Robert J. Flaherty.

Plot
The film deals with the adventures of a young Cajun boy and his pet raccoon, who live a somewhat idyllic existence playing in the bayous of Louisiana. A sub-plot involves his elderly father allowing an oil company to drill for oil in the inlet that runs behind their house. An inland barge is towed into the inlet from interconnecting waterways.  Most if not all of South Louisiana swamps and inland waters without land access were and are explored using dredged channels and barge rigs.   The film presents the rig crew tripping pipe (an oilfield operations term), changing a bit, and closing valves on the blow out preventers.  The rig crew are not actors, they are actual roughnecks.  Even though there is a moment of probable manufactured crisis when the rig drills into a trouble zone, the crew's actions are not choreographed per se.  The time frame is pre-OSHA, however there are serious doubts that drillers at that time allowed unshoed kids to hang out on the rig floor - ever.  As the story progresses the rig completes its operation and friendly drillers depart, leaving behind a phenomenally clean environment and a wealthy Cajun family.

Conflict and action for the plot is provided by the presence of a giant alligator in the area, which is believed to have eaten the pet raccoon and which is hunted in revenge. There is no individual or organized resistance to the incursion of the oil seekers, even after the (brief, offscreen) disaster, who are unequivocally portrayed as friendly, progressive humanitarians.

The boy, named in the film as Alexander Napoleon Ulysses Le Tour, but in the credits just identified as "the boy", was played by Joseph Boudreaux. The film was photographed by Richard Leacock and edited by Helen van Dongen, who were also the associate producers. Its original release was through independent film distributor Lopert Films.

l=
 Joseph Boudreaux as The Boy
 Lionel Le Blanc as His Father
 E. Bienvenu as His Mother (as Mrs. E. Bienvenu)
 Frank Hardy as The Driller
 C.P. Guedry as The Boilerman

Production
The film was shot on location in the Louisiana bayou country, using local residents for actors. However, none of the members of the Cajun family (boy, father and mother) were related, and the film does not deal with Cajun culture, the reality of the hard lives of the Cajun people, or with the mechanics of drilling for oil. The story is completely fictional.

In 1952, it was reissued by an exploitation film outfit with a new title, Cajun, on the bottom half of a double-bill with another film titled Watusi.

Reception and awards
The film was nominated for an Academy Award for Best Writing, Motion Picture Story in 1948. In 1949, Virgil Thomson won the Pulitzer Prize for Music for his score to the film (which is based on a famous field tape of authentic Cajun musicians and was performed by the Philadelphia Symphony). Through 2021, this has remained the only Pulitzer Prize awarded for a film score. In 1994, Louisiana Story was selected for preservation in the United States National Film Registry by the Library of Congress as being "culturally, historically, or aesthetically significant". The movie was also in the top 10 of the first British Film Institute's Sight and Sound poll in 1952.

The film is recognized by the American Film Institute in these lists:
 2005: AFI's 100 Years of Film Scores – Nominated

See also 
 Docufiction
 List of docufiction films

References

External links
 
 
 
 
 
 
 Patricia A. Suchy and James V. Catano, "Revisiting Flaherty's Louisiana Story", Southern Spaces (27 April 2010)
 Louisiana Story essay by Daniel Eagan in America's Film Legacy: The Authoritative Guide to the Landmark Movies in the National Film Registry, Bloomsbury Academic, 2010 , pages 419-421 

1948 films
United States National Film Registry films
Films directed by Robert Flaherty
Films set in Louisiana
Films shot in Louisiana
Southern Gothic films
Sponsored films
American docufiction films
Works about petroleum
Pulitzer Prize for Music-winning works
Films about raccoons
1940s American films